A beat-sheet is a document used in marketing, typically created by a product marketing manager.

See also 

 Product management
 Product marketing

Product management